Battle of Amritsar may refer to:

 Battle of Amritsar (1634)
 Battle of Amritsar (1757)